Arenal Volcano National Park is a Costa Rican national park in the central part of the country, part of the Arenal Huetar Norte Conservation Area. The park encompasses the Arenal Volcano, the most active in the country, which was believed to be dormant until a major eruption in 1968. It neighbors Lake Arenal, which is the site of the country's largest hydroelectricity project, the Lake Arenal Dam.

The park also contains a second volcano, Chato, whose crater contains a lagoon. It is also called Cerro Chato (literally Mount Chato) as it has been inactive for around 3500 years – coinciding with the creation and growth of Arenal itself. In and around the park are various lodges and hotels, some with their own hot springs, and others focused on the wildlife of the area.  Within the national park are the Museum of Volcanicity and a ranger station.

The park lies within the Arenal Huetar Norte Conservation Area, protecting eight of Costa Rica's 12 life zones and 16 protected reserves in the region between the Guanacaste and Tilarán mountain ranges, and including Lake Arenal. The park is most directly accessed from La Fortuna, but is also easily accessed via Tilarán and the north shore of Lake Arenal.

The Arenal Volcano National Park is popular with birders, as most of the 850 species identified in Costa Rica can be found within the park's borders. This includes one of the country's most elusive and beautiful birds, the endangered resplendent quetzal. Other animal species living within the park include white-faced capuchin monkeys, jaguar, deer, coati, and snakes like the fer-de-lance and parrot snake. The park also has a strong showing of plant life, including orchids, heliconias, ferns, laurel, cirri, guayabo de monte, palms, bromeliads, and strangler figs.

See also 
 Tourism in Costa Rica
 List of volcanoes in Costa Rica
 National Parks of Costa Rica
 La Fortuna, Costa Rica
 Arenal Hanging Bridges

External links 

Governing body National System of Conservation Areas official data 
1968 Arenal Eruption
Arenal Volcano National Park at Costa Rica National Parks
Arenal Volcano History

References

National parks of Costa Rica
Volcanic crater lakes
Protected areas established in 1991
Geography of Alajuela Province
Tourist attractions in Alajuela Province
1991 establishments in Costa Rica